Jackson v. Birmingham Board of Education, 544 U.S. 167 (2005), is a case in which the United States Supreme Court held that retaliation against a person because that person has complained of sex discrimination is a form of intentional sex discrimination encompassed by Title IX.

Background 
Roderick Jackson, a teacher in the Birmingham, Alabama, public school system, brought suit against the Birmingham Board of Education alleging that the board retaliated against him because he complained about sex discrimination at Ensley High School. Jackson, who had taught for six years prior in the Birmingham school district, was transferred to Ensley High School in August 1999 as a physical education teacher and girls' basketball coach.  Jackson discovered that Ensley High School did not provide equal funding and access to athletic equipment and facilities for the girls' teams.  In December 2000, Jackson began complaining of the unequal treatment, and began receiving negative evaluations.  Jackson was removed as the girls' basketball coach in May 2001.

The United States District Court for the Northern District of Alabama dismissed Jackson's claims on the grounds that Title IX's private right of action does not include claims of retaliation.  The Court of Appeals for the Eleventh Circuit affirmed the district court holding that Title IX does not provide a private right of action for retaliation.

Opinion of the Court 
Justice Sandra Day O'Connor writing for a 5-4 majority held that retaliation against individuals because they complain of sex discrimination is intentional conduct that violates the terms of Title IX.  O'Connor analogized the case to Sullivan v. Little Hunting Park, Inc., which held that 42 U.S.C. § 1982 provided a cause of action for retaliation for advocacy for African Americans.  Because Sullivan interpreted a general prohibition on racial discrimination to cover retaliation against those who advocate the rights of groups protected by that prohibition, so too should Title IX be read to prohibit retaliation for advocacy on behalf of those subjected to sex discrimination.

Dissent 
Justice Clarence Thomas authored a dissent joined by Chief Justice Rehnquist, Justice Scalia, and Justice Kennedy.  Thomas argued that retaliatory conduct is not discrimination on the basis of sex under the plain terms of Title IX.

See also
 List of United States Supreme Court cases, volume 544
List of United States Supreme Court cases

References

External links
 

United States Supreme Court cases
United States Supreme Court cases of the Rehnquist Court
United States education case law
2005 in United States case law
2005 in education
2005 in Alabama
Legal history of Alabama
Implied statutory cause of action case law
History of Birmingham, Alabama
Education in Birmingham, Alabama
Sexism